The Men's 10 metre air rifle event at the 2008 Olympic Games took place on August 11 at the Beijing Shooting Range Hall. Abhinav Bindra became the first ever individual Olympic champion of India.

The event consisted of two rounds: a qualifier and a final. In the qualifier, each shooter fired 60 shots with an air rifle at 10 metres distance from the standing position. Scores for each shot were in increments of 1, with a maximum score of 10. Abhinav Bindra became the 1st Individual Olympic Gold Medalist from India.

The top 8 shooters in the qualifying round moved on to the final round. There, they fired an additional 10 shots. These shots scored in increments of .1, with a maximum score of 10.9. The total score from all 70 shots was used to determine final ranking.

Records
The existing world and Olympic records were as follows.

Qualification round

Q Qualified for final

Final

References

Shooting at the 2008 Summer Olympics
Men's events at the 2008 Summer Olympics